John Frazee  (July 18, 1790 – February 24, 1852) was an American sculptor and architect. The Smithsonian has a collection of many of his sculptures as well as paintings of Frazee by other artists including Asher B. Durand and Henry Colton Shumway.

He was born in Rahway, New Jersey, and worked in the Neo-Classic tradition.  He is known as being one of the first successful native born American sculptors and "the first American born sculptor to execute a bust in marble".  He is best known for his portrait busts, including of John Jay and Marquis De Lafayette. He carved sculptures for the Boston Athenaeum including of Chief Justice John Marshall and Daniel Webster. He also received a commission to design the New York Customs House, later used as Federal Hall National Memorial.

The sculptor Thomas Crawford began his career as a marble carver in Frazee's studio in New York City.

In 1826, he helped found the National Academy of Design.

Selected works
 early 1820s, Elbridge Gerry Monument 
 1824, John Wells (1770 – 1823) First sculpture portrait by a native born American sculptor
 1827, Self-portrait sculpture
 1831, John Jay sculpture
 1831, John Henry Hobart (1775 – 1830) plaster sculpture
 1832, Nathaniel Prime bust
 1834, Daniel Webster marble sculpture
 1834, Nathaniel Bowditch (1773 – 1838) marble sculpture
 1834, Cadwallader D. Colden, (1769 – 1834) bas relief on tombstone
 1835, John Lowell sculpture
 1835, Thomas Handasyd Perkins (1764 – 1854) marble sculpture
 1835, John Marshall sculpture
 1836, Joseph Story sculpture
 1836, Judge William Prescott marble sculpture
 1836, William Prescott sculpture
 1839, Monument to Thomas Paine in New Rochelle, New York, (The bronze bust of Paine by sculptor Wilson MacDonald was added in 1899)
 1839, Thomas Paine memorial with bas relief
 1840, William Leggett portrait on tombstone
 1842, George Griswold III (1777 – 1859) bust
 1847, Monument to Charlotte Canda (1828 – 1845)
 ca. 1850, Andrew Jackson sculpture
 Luman Reed sculpture
 William Wetmore Story (1819 – 1895) marble sculpture
early 1830s,  Robert R. Randall attributed to Frazee

References

Further reading

From artisan to artist : John Frazee and the politics of culture in antebellum America by Linda Hyman 1983
John Frazee, American sculptor by Henry B. Caldwell 115 leaves, 20 leaves of plates : ill 1983, 1951 Call number:N40.1.F845 C14 1983a

19th-century American sculptors
19th-century American male artists
American male sculptors
1790 births
1852 deaths
People from Rahway, New Jersey
Sculptors from New Jersey
Monumental masons
19th-century American architects